Göktürk  is a small village in Gülnar district of Mersin Province, Turkey. The population of the village was 68 as of 2012.

References

Villages in Gülnar District